Squamura maculata is a moth in the family Cossidae. It is found on Sumatra, Borneo, Java and possibly in Cambodia. The habitat consists of lowland and lower montane forests.

References

Natural History Museum Lepidoptera generic names catalog

Metarbelinae
Moths described in 1890